Oracle NoSQL Database is a NoSQL-type distributed key-value database from Oracle Corporation. It provides transactional semantics for data manipulation, horizontal scalability, and simple administration and monitoring.

Oracle NoSQL Database Cloud Service is a managed cloud service for applications that require low latency, flexible data models, and elastic scaling for dynamic workloads.

Oracle NoSQL Database is a multi-model, multi-region, multi-cloud, active-active database designed to provide a highly available, scalable, performant, flexible, and reliable data management solution to meet today’s most demanding workloads. It can be deployed in enterprise data centers and cloud environments. It is well-suited for high volume and velocity workloads, like Internet of Things, 360-degree customer view, online contextual advertising, fraud detection, mobile application, user personalization, and online gaming.

Developers can use a single application interface to build applications that run in enterprise and cloud environments.Developers focus on application development and data store requirements rather than managing back-end servers, storage expansion, cluster deployments, topology, software installation/patches/upgrades, backup, operating systems, and availability. NoSQL database scales to meet dynamic application workloads and throughput requirements.

Users create tables to store their application data and perform database operations. A NoSQL table is similar to a relational table with additional properties including provisioned write units, read units, and storage capacity. Users provision the throughput and storage capacity in each table based on anticipated workloads. NoSQL Database resources are allocated and scaled accordingly to meet workload requirements. Users are billed hourly based on the capacity provisioned.

NoSQL Database supports tabular model. Each row is identified by a unique key, and has a value, of arbitrary length, which is interpreted by the application. The application can manipulate (insert, delete, update, read) a single row in a transaction. The application can also perform an iterative, non-transactional scan of all the rows in the database.

Licensing 
Oracle Corporation distributes the Oracle NoSQL Database in two editions:

Oracle NoSQL Database Server Community Edition under an Apache License, Version 2.0
Oracle NoSQL Enterprise Edition under the Oracle Commercial License

Oracle NoSQL Database is licensed using a freemium model: open-source versions of Oracle NoSQL Community Edition are available, but end-users can purchase additional features and support via the Oracle Store.

Oracle NoSQL Database drivers, licensed pursuant to the Apache 2.0 License, are used with both the community and enterprise editions.

Main features

Architecture 
Oracle NoSQL Database is built upon the Oracle Berkeley DB Java Edition high-availability storage engine. A layer of services is implemented on top of the storage engine to provide a distributed database architecture. Oracle NoSQL Database is designed for enterprise applications requiring predictable low latency, on-demand scalability, data model flexibility, effortless operations.

Sharding and replication 
Oracle NoSQL Database is a client-server, sharded, shared-nothing system. The data in each shard are replicated on each of the nodes that comprise the shard. It provides a simple key-value paradigm to the application developer. The major key for a record is hashed to identify the shard that the record belongs to. Oracle NoSQL Database is designed to support changing the number of shards dynamically in response to availability of additional hardware. If the number of shards changes, key-value pairs are redistributed across the new set of shards dynamically, without requiring a system shutdown and restart. A shard is made up of a single electable master node to serve read and write requests, and several replicas (usually two or more) that can serve read requests. Replicas are kept up to date using streaming replication. Each change on the master node is committed locally to disk and also propagated to the replicas.

High availability and fault-tolerance 
Oracle NoSQL Database provides single-master, multi-replica database replication. Transactional data is delivered to all replica nodes with flexible durability policies per transaction. In the event the master replica node fails, a consensus-based PAXOS-based automated fail-over election process minimizes downtime. As soon as the failed node is repaired, it rejoins the shard, updated and then becomes available for processing read requests. Thus, Oracle NoSQL Database applications can tolerate failures of nodes within a shard and also multiple failures of nodes in distinct shards.

Proper placement of masters and replicas on server hardware (racks and interconnect switches) by Oracle NoSQL Database is intended to increase availability on commodity servers.

Transparent load balancing 
Oracle NoSQL Database Driver partitions the data in real time and evenly distributes it across the storage nodes. It is network topology and latency-aware, routing read and write operations to the most appropriate storage node in order to optimize load distribution and performance.

Administration and system monitoring 
Oracle NoSQL Database's administration service can be accessed from a command-line interface. This service supports functionality such as the ability to configure, start, stop and monitor a storage node, without requiring configuration files, shell scripts, or explicit database operations. It allows Java Management Extensions (JMX) or Simple Network Management Protocol (SNMP) agents to be available for monitoring. This allows management clients to poll information about the status, performance metrics and operational parameters of a storage node and its managed services.

Elastic configuration 
"Elasticity" refers to dynamic online expansion of the deployed cluster. Adding storage nodes increases capacity, performance and reliability. Oracle NoSQL Database includes a topology planning feature, with which an administrator can modify the configuration of a NoSQL database while the database is online. The administrator can:

Increase data distribution: by increasing number of shards in the cluster, which increases write throughput.
Increase replication factor: by assigning additional replication nodes to each shard, which increases read throughput and system availability.
Rebalance data store: by modifying the capacity of storage nodes, the system can be rebalanced, re-allocating replication nodes to storage nodes as appropriate.

Administrators can move replication nodes and/or partitions from over-utilized nodes onto underutilized storage nodes or vice versa.

Multi-Region Table 
Oracle NoSQL Database multi-region, active-active architecture enables the creation of Multi-Region Tables in geographically distributed NoSQL clusters, maintaining consistent data across. A Multi-Region Table is a global, logical table that is deployed and maintained in different regions. It is a read-anywhere and write-anywhere table that lives in multiple regions. All Multi-Region Tables deployed in different regions are synchronized via NoSQL Streams. Each region’s NoSQL cluster may have a different topology, different hardware configuration, different operations, and security management. Multi-Region Tables support CRDT in JSON document and fixed-schema data models for conflict-free data replication across regions.

Multi-zone deployment 
Oracle NoSQL Database supports multiple zones to intelligently allocate replication of processes and data, in order to improve reliability during hardware, network and power-related failure modes. The two types of zones are: primary zones that contain nodes that can serve as masters or replicas and are typically connected by fast interconnects. Secondary zones contain nodes that can only serve as replicas. Secondary zones can be used to provide low latency read access to data at a distant location, or to offload read-only workloads such as analytics, report generation and data exchange for improved workload management.

JSON data format 
Oracle NoSQL Database supports Avro data serialization, which provides a compact, schema-based binary data format. Schemas are defined using JSON. Oracle NoSQL Database supports schema evolution. Configurable Smart Topology System administrators indicate how much capacity is available on a given storage node, allowing more capable nodes to host multiple replication nodes. Once the system knows about the capacity for the storage nodes in a configuration, it automatically allocates replication nodes intelligently. This is intended for better load balancing, better use of system resources and minimizing system impact in the event of storage node failure. Smart Topology supports data centers, ensuring that a full set of replicas is initially allocated to each data center.

Online rolling upgrade 
Oracle NoSQL Database provides facilities to perform a rolling upgrade, allowing a system administrator to upgrade cluster nodes while the database remains available.

Fault tolerance 
Oracle NoSQL Database is configurable to be either C/P or A/P in CAP. In particular, if writes are configured to be performed synchronously to all replicas, it is C/P in CAP i.e. a partition or node failure causes the system to be unavailable for writes. If replication is performed asynchronously, and reads are configured to be served from any replica, it is A/P in CAP i.e. the system is always available, but there is no guarantee of consistency.

Database features

Table data model 
A NoSQL table is a collection of record items with the same record type in a fixed schema data model, resembling the relational tables in RDBMS. Records are layered on top of the distributed key-value structure, inheriting all its advantages and simplifying application design by enabling seamless integration with familiar SQL-based applications.

Native JSON Data Type 
JSON data type stores schemaless data that does not conform to a rigid structure. Oracle NoSQL Database stores JSON documents in an internal binary (optimized) format that allows quick read access. Indexes can be created on any JSON object, including the deeply nested objects, to efficiently search and access the document.

Secondary index 
Secondary indexes offer an alternative way of retrieving table rows besides using primary keys. By creating a secondary index, queries can retrieve rows with different primary keys but share other characteristics. Oracle NoSQL Database supports rich secondary indexing capabilities, including indexing deeply nested arrays and maps, dramatically improve performance for queries.

Large object support 
Oracle NoSQL Database EE Stream based APIs allow reading and writing large objects (LOBs) such as audio and video files, without having to materialize the entire file in memory. This is intended to decrease the latency of operations across mixed workloads of objects of varying sizes.

SQL for NoSQL 
Developers can use the SQL-like interface to perform CRUD operations from a command-line interface, scripts, or SDKs. The interface supports flat relational data, hierarchical typed (schema-full) data, and schemaless JSON documents, handling multiple data models seamlessly. The SQL Path Expression enables navigating inside complex data structures and selecting their nested values using different step operations.

Partial JSON Document Update 
Developers can update (change, add, remove) a part of the JSON document. Such an update happens on the server side, eliminating the need for the read-modify-write cycle, which is atomic and thread-safe.

GeoJSON Support 
Data can be stored in GeoJSON format to represent geographical features, properties, and boundaries. Geometry types supported are Point, LineString, Polygon, MultiPoint, MultiLineString, MultiPolygon, and GeometryCollection. Search functions support queries on geographical data that have a relationship based on a specific geometry. Indexes can be created for optimal search performance.

ACID compliant transaction 
Oracle NoSQL Database provides ACID compliant transactions for full create, read, update and delete (CRUD) operations, with adjustable durability and consistency transaction guarantees. A sequence of operations can operate as a single atomic unit as long as all the affected records share the same major key path.

Hierarchical Tables 
The NoSQL table hierarchy organizes tables in a parent-child relationship for storage efficiency in write-heavy workloads and fine-grained table access for security. It also enables joining the parent-child tables using the NESTED TABLES clause and LEFT OUTER JOIN clause. LEFT OUTER JOIN closely resembles the semantics used in relational database queries. Oracle NoSQL 6 Data Sheet / Oracle NoSQL Database supports table hierarchy deployment in Multi-Region tables, ushering in a new application development paradigm.

Simple and Easy to Use APIs in Multiple Programming Languages 
Oracle NoSQL Database provides Java, Python, Node.js, Go, C, C#, and Spring Data drivers that allow developers to choose the right interface for their application development.

Oracle RESTful Services 
Oracle NoSQL Database supports Oracle REST Data Services (ORDS). This allows customers to build a REST-based application that can access data in either Oracle Database or Oracle NoSQL Database.

Apache Hadoop  
KVAvroInputFormat and KVInputFormat classes are available to read data from OND natively into Hadoop MapReduce jobs. One use for this class is to read NoSQL database records into Oracle Loader for Hadoop.

Oracle integration

Oracle Big Data SQL and Hive 
Oracle Big Data SQL is a common SQL access layer to data stored in Hadoop, HDFS, Hive and Oracle NoSQL Database. This allows customers to query Oracle NoSQL Data from Hive or Oracle Database. Users can run MapReduce jobs against data stored in Oracle NoSQL Database that is configured for secure access. The latest release also supports both primitive and complex data types.

Oracle Database  
Oracle NoSQL Database EE supports external table allows fetching Oracle NoSQL data from Oracle database using SQL statements such as Select, Select Count(*) etc. Once NoSQL data is exposed through external tables, one can access the data via standard JDBC drivers and/or visualize it through enterprise business intelligence tools.

Other Oracle products 
Oracle Event Processing (OEP) provides read access to Oracle NoSQL Database via the NoSQL Database cartridge. Once the cartridge is configured, CQL queries can be used. Oracle Semantic Graph includes a Jena Adapter for Oracle NoSQL Database to store large volumes of RDF data (as triplets/quadruplets). This adapter enables fast access to graph data stored in Oracle NoSQL Database via SPARQL queries. Integration with Oracle Coherence allows Oracle NoSQL Database to be used as a cache for Oracle Coherence applications, allowing applications to directly access cached data from Oracle NoSQL Database.

Enterprise security 
Oracle NoSQL Database EE supports OS-independent, cluster-wide password-based user authentication and Oracle Wallet integration and enables greater protection from unauthorized access to sensitive data. Additionally, session-level Secure Sockets Layer (SSL) encryption and network port restrictions improve protection from network intrusion.

Release Updates 
OND Version 4.0 – New Features:

 Full text search – Elastic Search.
 Time-To-Live – efficient aging out of “expired” data – a common IoT requirement.
 SQL Query – Declarative query language.
 Predicate Pushdown – ability to process predicates from Big Data SQL in NoSQL Database nodes without passing data that fails the predicate for improved performance and scalability.
 Import/Export – Easy to backup/restore data or move data between Oracle NoSQL Database stores.

Performance 

The Oracle NoSQL Database team has worked with several key Oracle partners, including Intel and Cisco, performing Yahoo! Cloud Serving Benchmarks (YCSB) on various hardware configurations, and published its results. For example, in 2012 Oracle reported that Oracle NoSQL Database exceeded 1 million mixed YCSB Ops/Sec.

See also 

 Database scalability

References

Oracle software
NoSQL
Database-related software for Linux
Big data products
Key-value databases
Software using the GNU AGPL license